Montek Singh Ahluwalia (born 24 November 1943) is an Indian economist and civil servant who was the Deputy Chairman of the Planning Commission of India, a position which carried the rank of a Cabinet Minister. He tendered his resignation for this post in May 2014 following the impending end of the UPA II regime at the center. He was previously the first Director of the Independent Evaluation Office at the International Monetary Fund.

Early life and education

Montek Singh Ahluwalia was born in Rawalpindi in 1943, the son of Jagmohan Singh, a clerk with the Defence Accounts Department, and Pushp Kaur.  He studied at St. Patrick's High School, Secunderabad and Delhi Public School, Mathura Road. He graduated with a B.A. (Hons) degree from St. Stephen's College, Delhi, University of Delhi. He was a Rhodes scholar at the University of Oxford where he studied at Magdalen College, Oxford, as a graduate obtaining an M.A. in philosophy, politics and economics. He then read for an MPhil at St Antony's College, Oxford. While at Oxford, he was president of the Oxford Union. He has received several honorary degrees, including an honorary degree of Doctor of Civil Law from the University of Oxford and an honorary degree of Doctor of Philosophy from the Indian Institute of Technology, Roorkee. He is an Honorary Fellow of Magdalen College.

Career

After graduating from University of Oxford, Ahluwalia joined the World Bank in 1968. At the age of 28, he became the youngest "Division Chief" in the World Bank's bureaucracy, in charge of the Income Distribution Division in the World Bank's Development Research Centre. After his return to India in 1979 he took up the position of Economic Adviser in the Ministry of Finance. He held several senior positions as a civil servant, including Special Secretary to the Prime Minister, Commerce secretary, Secretary Department of Economic Affairs in the Finance Ministry and Finance Secretary. In 1998 he was appointed Member of the Planning Commission. In 2001, he was chosen by the Board of International Monetary Fund to be the first director of the newly created Independent Evaluation Office, in which capacity he supervised several studies critical of various aspects of the functioning of the IMF. In June 2004, he resigned from the IMF position to take up as the deputy chairman of the Planning Commission as part of the United Progressive Alliance government in New Delhi.

As deputy chairman of the Planning Commission, he supervised the preparation of both the Eleventh Plan (2007–08 to 2011–12) titled "Towards Faster and More Inclusive Growth" and subsequently also the Twelfth Plan (2012–13 to 2016–17) titled "Faster, More Inclusive and Sustainable Growth".

He has published a number of articles on various aspects of the Indian economy in academic journals. He is one of the authors of "Redistribution with Growth" by Chenery et al., published by Oxford University Press in 1974. He has also written on various aspects of India's economic reforms and on the inclusiveness of India's growth process.

In 2011 Ahluwalia was awarded the Padma Vibhushan, India's second highest civilian honour for public service by Mrs Pratibha Patil, then President of India. 

In February 2020, he published his book Backstage: The Story Behind India’s High Growth Years with Rupa Publications. The book is a mix of personal reflections and national economic history, and sets forth Ahluwalia's ideas on issues of contemporary significance including education, rural development and energy.

He currently holds the position of Distinguished Fellow at the Centre for Social and Economic Progress - a New Delhi based think tank. In June 2021, Ahluwalia was named for the high level advisory group formed jointly by IMF and World bank in the face of dual challenges of Climate Change and COVID-19 pandemic.

Publications

Journal articles

Book 

 Backstage: The Story Behind India’s High Growth Years (15 February 2020), Rupa Publications India,

Chapters in books

World Bank 

  Reprint series number 60.

Personal life

Ahluwalia was married to fellow economist Isher Judge Ahluwalia and has two sons Pawan Ahluwalia and Aman Ahluwalia.

Awards and honours

References

External links

 Planning Commission Website 
 IMF entry on Montek Singh Ahluwalia
 Montek Singh Ahluwalia's address at IIM Ahmedabad in Mp3
 For a critical review of aspects of Montek Ahluwalia's economic policy-making, see "Fallacious Finance: Congress, BJP, CPI-M et al may be leading India to hyperinflation" first published in The Statesman newspaper, 5 March 2007 Editorial Page Special Article www.thestatesman.net, now also at "Fallacious Finance: Congress, BJP, CPI-M et al may be leading India to hyperinflation". independentindian.com

1943 births
Indian economists
St. Stephen's College, Delhi alumni
Delhi University alumni
Alumni of Magdalen College, Oxford
Fellows of Magdalen College, Oxford
Alumni of the University of Oxford
Group of Thirty
Indian civil servants
20th-century Indian economists
21st-century Indian economists
Indian Rhodes Scholars
Indian Sikhs
Punjabi people
Living people
Recipients of the Padma Vibhushan in public affairs
Delhi Public School alumni
Members of the Planning Commission of India
Presidents of the Oxford Union
Ahluwalia